The sculptured Dendera zodiac (or Denderah zodiac) is a widely known Egyptian bas-relief from the ceiling of the pronaos (or portico) of a chapel dedicated to Osiris in the Hathor temple at Dendera, containing images of Taurus (the bull) and Libra (the scales). This chapel was begun in the late Ptolemaic period; its pronaos was added by the emperor Tiberius. This led Jean-François Champollion to date the relief to the Greco-Roman period, but most of his contemporaries believed it to be of the New Kingdom. The relief, which John H. Rogers characterised as "the only complete map that we have of an ancient sky", has been conjectured to represent the basis on which later astronomy systems were based. It is now on display at the Musée du Louvre, Paris.

Description
The sky disc is centered on the north pole star, with Ursa Minor depicted as a jackal. An inner disc is composed of constellations showing the signs of the zodiac. Some of these are represented in the same Greco-Roman iconographic forms as their familiar counterparts (e.g. the Ram, Taurus, Scorpio, and Capricorn), whilst others are shown in a more Egyptian form: Aquarius is represented as the flood god Hapy, holding two vases which gush water. Rogers noted the similarities of unfamiliar iconology with the three surviving tablets of a Seleucid zodiac and both relating to kudurru ('boundary stone') representations: in short, Rogers sees the Dendera zodiac as "a complete copy of the Mesopotamian zodiac".

Four women and four pairs of falcon-headed figures, arranged 45° from one another, hold up the sky disc, the outermost ring of which features 36 figures representing the 36 asterisms used to track both the 36 forty-minute "hours" that divided the Egyptian night, as well as the 36 ten-day "weeks" (decans) of the Egyptian year (with 5 days excluded). The square of the overall sculpture is oriented to the walls of the temple.

This sculptural representation of the zodiac in circular form is unique in ancient Egyptian art. More typical are the rectangular zodiacs which decorate the same temple's pronaos.

History
During the Napoleonic campaign in Egypt, Vivant Denon drew the circular zodiac, the more widely known one, and the rectangular zodiacs. In 1802, after the Napoleonic expedition, Denon published engravings of the temple ceiling in his Voyage dans la Basse et la Haute Egypte. These elicited a controversy as to the age of the zodiac representation, ranging from tens of thousands to a thousand years to a few hundred, and whether the zodiac was a planisphere or an astrological chart. Sébastien Louis Saulnier, an antique dealer, commissioned Claude Lelorrain to remove the circular zodiac with saws, jacks, scissors and gunpowder. The zodiac ceiling was moved in 1821 to Restoration Paris and, by 1822, was installed by Louis XVIII in the Royal Library (later called the National Library of France). In 1922, the zodiac moved from there to the Louvre.

Dating 
The controversy around the zodiac's dating, known as the "Dendera Affair", involved people of the likes of Joseph Fourier (who estimated that the age was 2500 BC). Champollion, among others, believed that it was a religious zodiac. Champollion placed the zodiac in fourth century AD. Georges Cuvier placed the date 123 AD to 147 AD. His discussion of the dating summarizes the reasoning as he understood it in the 1820s.

Sylvie Cauville of the Centre for Computer-aided Egyptological Research at Utrecht University and Éric Aubourg dated it to 50 BC through an examination of the configuration it shows of the five planets known to the Egyptians, a configuration that occurs once every thousand years, and the identification of two eclipses.
The solar eclipse indicates the date of March 7, 51 BC: it is represented by a circle containing the goddess Isis holding a baboon (the god Thoth) by the tail.
The lunar eclipse indicates the date of September 25, 52 BC: it is represented by an Eye of Horus locked into a circle.

Notes

References

Further reading
 Sébastien Louis Saulnier, Claude Lelorrain, Éditions Sétier, 1822.
 Nicolas B. Halma, Examen et explication du zodiaque de Denderah comparé au globe céleste antique d'Alexandrie, Éditions Merlin, 1822.
 J. Chabert, L. D. Ferlus, Mahmoud Saba, Explication du zodiaque de Denderah (Tentyris), Éditions Guiraudet, 1822.
 Jean Saint-Martin, Notice sur le zodiaque de Denderah, Éditions C.J. Trouvé, 1822. 
 Jean-Baptiste Biot, Firmin Didot, 1823.
 Charles de Hesse, La pierre zodiacale du Temple de Dendérah, Éditions André Seidelin, 1824.
 Jacques-Joseph Champollion-Figeac, Firmin Didot, 1832.
 Jean-Baptiste Prosper Jollois; René Édouard de Villiers du Terrage, Recherches sur les bas-reliefs astronomiques des Égyptiens, Carilian-Goeury, 1834. 
 Letronne Antoine-Jean, Analyse critique des représentations zodiacales de Dendéra et d'Esné, Imprimerie Royale, 1855.
 Franz Joseph Lauth, Les zodiaques de Denderah, Éditions C. Wolf et Fils, 1865.
 Éric Aubourg, "La date de conception du zodiaque du temple d'Hathor à Dendérah", Bulletin de l’Institut Français d’Archéologie Orientale, 95 (1995), 1–10.
 Sylvie Cauville :
 Le temple d'Isis à Dendéra, BSFE 123, 1992.
 Le temple de Dendérah, IFAO, 1995.
 Le zodiaque d'Osiris, Peeters, 1997 (corr. 2nd ed. 2015).
 L'Œil de Ré, Pygmalion, 1999.
 Jed Z. Buchwald, "Egyptian Stars under Paris Skies", Engineering & Science, 66 (2003), nr. 4, 20–31.
 Jed Z. Buchwald & Diane Greco Josefowicz, The Zodiac of Paris: How an Improbable Controversy over an Ancient Egyptian Artifact provoked a Modern Debate between Religion and Science, Princeton University Press, 2010.

External links

 The Zodiac in the Louvre collections database 
 Gyula Priskin, The Dendera zodiacs as narratives of the myth of Osiris, Isis, and the child Horus ENiM 8 (2015), 133–185.

Egyptian antiquities of the Louvre
Sculptures of ancient Egypt
Ancient astronomy
Egyptian calendar
Reliefs in France